The 1998 Categoría Primera A season, known as Copa Mustang 1998 for sponsoring purposes, was the 51st season of the Categoría Primera A, Colombia's top-flight football league. The season started on 1 February and ended on 20 December 1998. Deportivo Cali were the champions, clinching their seventh domestic league title after beating Once Caldas in the finals.

América de Cali were the defending champions, but placed third in their semifinal group and thus failed to qualify for the final stage of the competition.

Format 
The competition returned to its usual calendar year system, following the year-and-a-half tournament played in 1996–97, and was split into four stages: the Apertura and Finalización tournaments, the semifinals, and the finals. In the Apertura tournament, the 16 teams played each other under a double round-robin format as well as six additional rounds divided into regional groups for a total of 36 games, whilst the Finalización tournament had 14 rounds with the teams being divided into two groups of eight. An aggregate table considering the results of both tournaments was used to decide the eight teams that would advance to the semifinals, with the top four of said table receiving bonus points to be applied in the next stage of the competition. In the semifinals, the eight qualified teams were split into two groups of four and played each one of their group rivals twice, with the winners of each group playing a final series over two legs to decide the champions of the season. In the event that both teams tied on points at the end of the second leg of the finals, a tiebreaker match on neutral ground would be played. The winners of the Apertura tournament and the season champions qualified for the 1999 Copa Libertadores, but since Once Caldas won both tournaments of the season and also advanced to the final, then the other finalist (Deportivo Cali) also qualified for the Copa Libertadores.

This was the last tournament in which teams were awarded bonus points, as well as the last one in which draws triggered a penalty shoot-out, in which the winning side ended up earning an additional point.

Teams 
16 teams competed in the season, the top 15 teams of the relegation table of the 1996–97 season and Atlético Huila, who were promoted as champions of the 1997 Categoría Primera B tournament, replacing Deportivo Pereira who were relegated at the end of the previous season.

Torneo Apertura 
The Torneo Apertura (also known as Copa Mustang I) began on 1 February and ended in late September.

Standings

Torneo Finalización 
The Torneo Finalización (also known as Copa Mustang II) began in early October and ended on 19 November. Teams were divided into two groups according to their placement in the Apertura tournament: odd-placed teams made up Group A while even-placed ones made up Group B.

Group A

Group B

Aggregate table 
An aggregate table known as Reclasificación including the games of both tournaments (Apertura and Finalización) was used to determine the teams that would advance to the semifinal stage, as well as the team to be relegated at the end of the season. The top eight teams in this table at the end of the Torneo Finalización advanced to the semifinals, while the team placed last was relegated to Categoría Primera B for the following season.

Semifinals 
In the third stage of the tournament, the eight qualified teams were split into two groups according to their final position in the season's aggregate table, and played each one of the other teams in their group under a double round-robin system with the teams with the most points in each group at the end of this stage advancing to the final.

Group A

Group B

Finals 

Deportivo Cali won 4–1 on points.

Top goalscorers 

Source: Historia del Fútbol Profesional Colombiano 70 Años

References

External links 
 Dimayor official website
 Colombia 1998 RSSSF

Categoría Primera A seasons
1
Col